Europa Universalis IV is a 2013 grand strategy video game in the Europa Universalis series, developed by Paradox Development Studio and published by Paradox Interactive as a sequel to Europa Universalis III (2007). The game was released on 13 August 2013. It is a strategy game where players can control a nation from the Late Middle Ages through the early modern period (1444–1821), conducting trade, administration, diplomacy, colonization, and warfare.

Gameplay
The game has been formed to begin historically, with events occurring when they did in history. The game itself is an interactive map of Earth divided into the provinces that compose nations. Each of these provinces contribute to their country either positively or negatively, as provinces can both provide resources to a nation and serve as a point of unrest and rebellion. The gameplay requires the player to lead a nation by finding a balance of military, diplomacy, and economy. The player does so through their choices as sovereign of their nation, and through the spending of resources available to them: prestige, power projection, stability, gold (ducats), manpower, legitimacy for monarchies, republican tradition for republics, devotion for theocracies, horde unity for steppe nomads, meritocracy for celestial empires, and monarch power (administrative, diplomatic, and military).

Players can choose to conquer the world by military might, become a colonial superpower, establish trade dominance, etc. as one of over 500 different nations. These nations range alphabetically from Aachen to Zuni. The game is a sandbox environment, and while there is no strict rule on winning the game, the game of the player is over when the player's nation is removed, or annexed, from the map, or the date reaches the year 1821. Diplomacy is a large aspect of the game, as creating alliances, (or vassal states and tributaries), improving opinions, and preventing defensive coalitions are vital to a player's survival. Espionage can also be employed against enemy states in order to claim their territory, or incite rebellion in their provinces, along with other dubious ends. Combat can be waged on both land and sea, during which the game attempts to simulate real world factors such as morale, discipline, varying unit types with associated strengths and weaknesses, competency of leaders, terrain and supply lines. Trade is also an important part of the game, where the world is divided into many trade nodes and trade flows through each of the nodes and can be collected by merchants.

Many major religions, such as Catholic, Orthodox, Protestant, Sunni, and Shia are present in the game and can provide distinct bonuses to their practitioners. Players can employ missionaries to convert their provinces or can engage in policies of universal religious freedom. For example, the Catholic faith makes use of the Papacy, which can allow a nation to have control over the Pope or to use their influence for other rewards. Native American and Aboriginal religions are also present in the game, most commonly utilizing a system of selecting a bonus for the lifetime of the present monarch.

Furthermore, many of the world's institutions, from feudalism to industrialization, are also present in the game. Institutions normally begin around a certain year, and begin spreading through provinces. The rate of institution spread and where the institution spawns is malleable to player actions. The institution coincides with increasing the price of technology, as the lack of an embraced institution increases the cost of corresponding technological levels. Once reaching requirements, usually consisting of a ducat cost and a certain amount of institution present in the player's provinces, the player is able to embrace the institution. An embracement gives an institution-specific nation bonus, as well as purging any technological maluses that the lack of institution may have incurred.

Technological advancements are invested in over time, and require the expense of monarch points. They provide benefits to the nation as detailed below:
 Administrative technology unlocks advancements such as increased productivity, new forms of government, new buildings, and the national idea system.
 Diplomatic technology unlocks advancements such as naval units, improvements in trade, new buildings, and improved colonial expansion.
 Military technology unlocks advancements such as new types of land units, improved unit morale, combat tactics, and new buildings.

Gameplay is influenced by random events that arise every so often for the player. These events can be either helpful or harmful. Some of these random events are driven by an individual country's history, while some can apply to any country and serve generally to enhance the "flavor" of the game. Some events are also motivated by various institutions that occur throughout the history of the game, such as the Industrial Revolution. Players can choose to play single player mode versus the AI, or multiplayer over a LAN or the Internet against a mix of human and AI opponents. Single player also has the option of "Ironman" mode, which locks several settings such as difficulty, and removes the control of saving the game from the player. This means that any mistakes are irreversible. It is, however, the only way to receive any of the game's many achievements.

Development
Early design discussions for Europa Universalis IV began shortly after the December 2010 release of Divine Wind, the final DLC for Europa Universalis III with development, based on the Clausewitz Engine, beginning in earnest in about September 2011. It was first announced to the public in August 2012, to coincide with a showing at that year's Gamescom, after having been teased under the codename of "Project Truman".

Throughout the game's development, Paradox Development Studio released weekly "developer diaries" via their online forums, in which they detailed some feature of the game's development. These included information about design philosophy, game mechanisms that were being implemented, and features from Europa Universalis III that were being removed.

During its development, Europa Universalis IV had a greater priority given to stability and quality control than had previous games in the series. There had previously been a perception that Paradox's games were not worth buying until several updates or expansions had fixed stability issues. Studio CEO, Fredrik Wester, described this perception as being like "a slap in the face", motivating them to improve. Another of Paradox's major goals was to retain the depth and complexity of their earlier grand strategy games, while making them easier for a player to interact with.

Prior to release, a preview version of the game was showcased through Let's Plays and via a multiplayer event for journalists. A playable demo of the game was released on Steam on 9 August 2013 with the game itself being released on 13 August.

Following its release, development of the game has continued under the same model that Paradox had previously used successfully for Crusader Kings II, with paid DLCs being released alongside, and helping to fund, additional free patches which add more features to the base game. , eighteen expansions have been released for the game alongside many minor DLCs offering additional graphical or musical options.

In September 2020, Paradox Tinto, a newly formed division of Paradox, took over development of the game led by leader Johan Andersson. This team released the expansions Leviathan and Origins, while also focusing on bug fixes and eventually ending development on the game.

Expansions and mods

A number of downloadable content (DLC) have been released for the game. All DLCs are optional and may be applied to the base game in any combination. The most significant DLCs come in the form of expansions and immersion packs.

Expansions on one hand, bring broader and considerable changes to the game as they introduce new and improved gameplay mechanics along with many kinds of flavor and various balance tweaks. While immersion packs on the other hand, are expansions of a smaller scale as they focus on specific regions to bring them better to life by granting more flavor.

There are also flavor packs (which add new events and minor mechanisms, usually specific to one nation), music packs (which add more backing music) and cosmetic packs (which affect unit models, portraits, and the map). There are also three e-books which have no impact on the game itself, but coincided with the release of expansions.

In March 2021, Paradox unveiled an optional subscription service to play the game's vast library of DLC without buying each individual expansion.

Expansions are often accompanied by coinciding free patches to the game, which may adjust existing mechanisms or add new ones in the theme of the expansion.

Mods
Aside from the official expansion packs, third-party mods are available on sites such as the Steam Workshop. The mods can change the game's setting, add or remove features and game mechanisms, add new land masses to the "random new world" generator, and make graphical improvements. Popular mods include "Extended Timeline", which expands the game's scope from 2 AD to the year 9999, the Game of Thrones adaptation "A Song of Ice and Fire" and The Elder Scrolls adaptation "Elder Scrolls Universalis", to complete overhauls like "MEIOU & Taxes" and fantasy total conversions such as "Anbennar".

Reception 

Europa Universalis IV was met with generally favourable reviews, receiving a score of 87/100 on aggregate website Metacritic. Critics praised the improvements from Europa Universalis III, especially the new mechanisms and graphics. T. J. Hafer of PC Gamer described the game as an "engrossing simulation that conquers the common ground between your average Civilization V player and the long-time devotees of grand strategy". Negative feedback focused on the tutorials, combat mechanisms, and bugs. Nicholas Pellegatta acknowledged these bugs and other issues were likely to be addressed in later patches and expansions.

In 2013 Europa Universalis IV won "Best Strategy" and "Best Historical" in Game Debate's 2013 awards.

It was nominated for "Strategy/Simulation Game of the Year" at the 2014 D.I.C.E. Awards.

The 2021 expansion Leviathan was the worst-rated title on the Steam platform at launch, with only 7% positive reviews. Players complained about a multitude of bugs and untested or incomplete features.

From 30 September to 7 October 2021, Europa Universalis IV was available for free on the Epic Games Store.

Sales 
As of February 2014, Europa Universalis IV had sold over 300,000 copies. By January 2016, over 900,000 games were registered on Steam. As of 21 June 2016, over 1 million copies have been sold. As of February 2021, the game has over 2 million owners.

Pricing adjustments 
In May 2017, Paradox Interactive normalized the prices of the game worldwide and its other products to account for the games being cheaper than intended in many non-western nations, just weeks before the annual summer Steam sale. This has led to massive backlash and boycotts by people from the affected nations, including a massive increase in negative user reviews on Steam in the following weeks. Later on 22 June, Paradox CEO Fredrik Wester announced that the prices would be returned to previous levels after the Steam summer sale and claimed they would try to reimburse anyone who bought their products during the time of the price adjustment.

Spin-offs
In May 2014, Paradox released a book, Europa Universalis IV: What If? the Anthology of Alternate History, a collection of short stories inspired by the game and its time period, including one by Harry Turtledove. The book was released as an ebook, as DLC for the game, and as a physical edition.

In May 2018, at their PDXCon convention, Paradox announced that board games were being developed based upon four of their franchises, stating that they were on a "mission to expand the IP". The Europa Universalis game (eventually named Europa Universalis: the Price of Power) was designed by Eivind Vetlesen of Aegir Games and has a solo mode by David Turczi. Jonathan Bolding of PC Gamer described a preview version as "something between a high player count Twilight Imperium and A Game of Thrones with a dash of Napoleon in Europe". No release date has been specified, but the game is expected to release in mid to late 2022.

See also

 List of grand strategy video games 
 List of Paradox Interactive games
 List of historical video games

References

External links
 

2013 video games
Age of Discovery video games
Historical simulation games
Grand strategy video games
Government simulation video games
Linux games
MacOS games
Paradox Interactive games
Real-time strategy video games
Video games with Steam Workshop support
Video game sequels
Video games developed in Sweden
Video games set in the 15th century
Video games set in the 16th century
Video games set in the 17th century
Video games set in the 18th century
Video games set in the 19th century
Video games with expansion packs
Windows games
Video games set in the Byzantine Empire
Video games set in the Ottoman Empire